The Taiwan rosefinch (Carpodacus formosanus) is a species of finch in the family Fringillidae.  It was formerly considered a subspecies of the vinaceous rosefinch. It is endemic to Taiwan. Its natural habitats are temperate forests and subtropical or tropical dry forests.

References

Taiwan rosefinch
Birds of Taiwan
Taiwan rosefinch